James Edmeston (10 September 1791 – 7 January 1867) was an English architect and surveyor; he was also known as a prolific writer of church hymns.

He was born in Wapping, Middlesex, England. His maternal grandfather was the Reverend Samuel Brewer, congregationalist pastor at Stepney Meeting House for 50 years. However, James was attracted to the Church of England and soon became an Anglican.

Architectural work
Edmeston began as an architect in 1816. He designed several structures in London, including drinking fountains and St Paul's, Onslow Square.  George Gilbert Scott was his pupil, articled to Edmedston in 1827. In 1864 he built Columbia Wharf, Rotherhithe, the first grain silo in a British port.

Literary work
Edmeston started by writing poetry publishing The Search, and other Poems in 1817.

Ecclesiastical and charity career
He served as the church warden at St. Barnabas in Homerton, Middlesex, and was a strong supporter of and frequent visitor to the London Orphan Asylum. Edmeston is said to have written 2000 hymns, one every Sunday. His best-known hymn is the popular wedding hymn 'Lead us, Heavenly Father, lead us / O'er the world's tempestuous sea'. The hymn has been set to several tunes, one of which, Mannheim, is by German composer Friedrich Filitz.

He died in Homerton in 1867.

References

1791 births
1867 deaths
People from Wapping
People from the London Borough of Hackney
Architects from London
Christian hymnwriters
English hymnwriters
English Anglicans
19th-century English architects
19th-century English musicians